Crush Bar (sometimes simply Crush) is a gay bar and restaurant in southeast Portland, Oregon's Buckman neighborhood.

Description

Willamette Week Lizzy Acker described Crush as "a welcoming neighborhood gay bar for everyone". Furthermore, she wrote, "if you can't find something you like, either sidled up to the bar chatting up the bartenders, in the back watching a burlesque show, playing video poker off to the side, or outside on the sidewalk smoking cigarettes and making new friends, well, that's on you... Crush is not populated by cool girls and boys, staring at their phones trying to impress everyone with their boredom. If you want that, your options are endless. But if you're looking for a place to dance till you're naked or sing along with strangers, this is your spot." The newspaper's Aaron Spencer described the bar's atmosphere as "loungey, with bottle art and mood lighting, but unpretentious.

The bar is owned by Woody Clarke. Crush's logo features images of two men holding hands, a woman and a man holding hands, and two women holding hands. The bar has unisex public toilets and hosts a monthly event called Bi Bar, as of 2014.

In his 2019 "overview of Portland's LGBTQ+ nightlife for the newcomer", Andrew Jankowski of the Portland Mercury wrote: "Crush is among Portland’s coziest, most queer-friendly bars, and is presently Southeast Portland’s only LGBTQ+ bar. Crush offers a foodie-friendly menu, crafted cocktails, sidewalk patio, burlesque-drag revues, stand-up comedy shows, nonbinary concerts, and pants-free dance parties."

History

On March 17, 2020, Crush Bar was forced to close due to the Oregon Governor's mandate for the COVID-19 pandemic. The current owner John Clarke terminated all 27 employees and refused to pay out any form of compensation. The bar's union, Crush Bar Workers Collective (CBWC), staged a sit-in to demand compensation for "accrued sick time pay off, half-time pay for our scheduled hours one week out, and guarantee rehires when the bar reopens". The owner denied these requests and contacted law enforcement to have the union members removed. Two days later the owner backtracked their claim and agreed to compensate the employees for their sick leave.

Reception
Crush has been recognized multiple times by Willamette Week annual readers' poll. The bar was named "Best LGBT Bar" in 2015, and "Best LGBT Bar" and runner-up in the "Best Drag Show" category in 2016. Crush was named the city's best bar in 2017, and "Best LGBTQ Bar" and runner-up in the "Best Happy Hour" category in 2018. Crush Bar won in the "Best LGBTQ Bar" category of Willamette Week "Best of Portland Readers' Poll 2020".

References

External links

 
 Crush Bar at Frommer's
 Crush at The Portland Mercury

Buckman, Portland, Oregon
LGBT culture in Portland, Oregon
LGBT drinking establishments in Oregon